A list of films produced in Hong Kong in 2000:.

2000

External links
 IMDB list of Hong Kong films
 Hong Kong films of 2000 at HKcinemamagic.com

2000
Lists of 2000 films by country or language
2000 in Hong Kong